Team Athletics Saint Vincent & The Grenadines (TASVG) is the governing body for the sport of athletics in Saint Vincent and the Grenadines.

History 
TASVG was founded in 1943 as Saint Vincent and the Grenadines Amateur Athletics Association (SVGAAA) and was affiliated to the IAAF in 1974.  The name was changed to Team Athletics Saint Vincent & The Grenadines (TASVG), with its constitution dated December 12, 2004.

Current president is Keith Joseph. He was re-elected in December 2013.

Affiliations 
TASVG is the national member federation for Saint Vincent and the Grenadines in the following international organisations:
World Athletics
North American, Central American and Caribbean Athletic Association (NACAC)
Association of Panamerican Athletics (APA)
Central American and Caribbean Athletic Confederation (CACAC)
Moreover, it is part of the following national organisations:
Saint Vincent and the Grenadines National Olympic Committee (SVGNOC)

National records 
TASVG maintains the Vincentian records in athletics.

References

External links 
Official webpage

Saint Vincent and the Grenadines
Athletics
National governing bodies for athletics
Sports organizations established in 1943